Starlite is a thermal insulate material.

Starlite or Star Lite may also refer to:

Military
 Operation Starlite or Battle of Van Tuong, a 1966 battle in the U.S.–Vietnam War
 STARLite Radar, a U.S. Army radar system

Music
 Starlite Festival, an international music festival in Marbella, Spain
 Starlite Music Theatre a former theater in Latham, New York, U.S.
 Starlite Orchestra, Mandacy Entertainment's inhouse musicians
 Starlite Records, a UK record label
 "Starlite", a 2006 song by Panacea from Ink Is My Drink

Transport
 Nu-Klea Starlite, an electric car by Nu-Klea
 Starlite Ferries, a ferry company in the Philippines
 Star-Lite Aircraft, a U.S. aircraft manufacturer
 StarLite Engineering, a U.S. company producing the StarLite Warp

Other uses
 Starlite (video game), 2009 multiplayer online game
 Star Lite Motel, a historic motel in Dilworth, Minnesota, U.S.
 STAR-LITE, an astrophysics experiment aboard U.S. Space Shuttle flight STS-95
 Samsung Galaxy A9 Star Lite, a smartphone in the Samsung Galaxy A series

People with the name
 Francis Farewell Starlite (born 1981) U.S. musician
 Starlite Lotulelei Jr. (born 1989) U.S. American football player

See also

 "Detroit Star-Lite", a song by Sarge from "Distant"
 Starlight, the light of stars
 Starlight (disambiguation)
 Staurolite, a prismatic crystalline mineral
 Steatite, a ceramic mineral